Raj Bhavan Road is a prominent political and commercial area of Hyderabad, Telangana, India. It is home to the residence of the Governor of Telangana called as Raj Bhavan, hence the name.
It also has Lake View Guest House, a state owned guest house for the visiting dignitaries. It overlooks the Hussain sagar lake to its east.

Commercial area
There are some upmarket shops on this road.

Reliance Communications is headquartered here.

Transport
Khairtabad is the closest MMTS Train station for this suburb.

Buses are run by the state-owned TSRTC, and is well connected to all parts of Hyderabad.

References

Neighbourhoods in Hyderabad, India